Bearpaw or Bear Paw may refer to:
Bearpaw (brand), a brand of footwear, including sheepskin boots, slippers and casual shoes 
Bearpaw Formation, a rock formation in North America
Bear-paw poppies, the genus of the poppy family Papaveraceae
Mikołaj "Bearpaw" Potocki (1595–1651), Polish nobleman
Bearpaw Mountain, a summit in Washington state
Bear Paw Mountains, mountain range in the U.S. state of Montana 
Bear's Paw, a mountain in the U.S. state of North Carolina
a type of snowshoe

See also
Battle of Bear Paw